Kępa  is a village in the administrative district of Gmina Długołęka, within Wrocław County, Lower Silesian Voivodeship, in south-western Poland.

The village has a population of 180.

References

Kepa